The Friendship Bridge is an arch bridge connecting the Brazilian city of Foz do Iguaçu and the Paraguayan city of Ciudad del Este.

History and importance
The bridge was opened to traffic in 1965. The space between the main arch is 290 metres (303 yards in total). The bridge itself is 552.4 m long.

The bridge is extremely important to the economies of both Foz  do  Iguaçu and Ciudad del Este. 

BR-277 begins immediately after the end of the bridge in the Brazilian side, and National Route N° 7 in the Paraguayan side.

Gallery

See also
Brazil–Paraguay border

References

External links

 

Deck arch bridges
Concrete bridges
Bridges in Brazil
Bridges in Paraguay
International bridges
Brazil–Paraguay border crossings
Ciudad del Este
Foz do Iguaçu
Bridges over the Paraná River
Bridges completed in 1965
Buildings and structures in Paraná (state)
Transport in Paraná (state)